"Algivirga pacifica" is a Gram-negative and aerobic bacterium from the genus "Algivirga" which has been isolated from seawater from Micronesia.

References

Cytophagia
Bacteria described in 2013